Veettilekkulla Vazhi is a 2010 Indian Malayalam adventure drama film written and directed by Dr. Biju. The film  is about terrorist organizations operating in India and how they recruit young Keralites. It stars Prithviraj, Indrajith and Master Govardhan in main lead roles.

The film's world premiere took place at the 12th Mumbai Film Festival on 22 October 2010 as the opening film in the Indian Frames section. It was an official selection for 28 international film festivals. It won the award for Best Feature Film in Malayalam at the 58th National Film Awards and the NETPAC Award. It also received accolades at the Zanzibar International Film Festival and Imagine India Film Festival, Spain. The film released in theatres in Kerala on 5 August 2011.

Plot
The film's story revolves around a doctor (Prithviraj) with a haunting past. He witnessed his wife (Malavika) and five-year-old son die in an explosion at a market in Delhi.

Now working at a prison hospital, the doctor is assigned the case of a woman in critical condition, a surviving member from a suicide squad of the ‘Indian Jihadi’, a notorious terrorist group.
 
Despite the doctor's best efforts, the woman dies. But before dying, she entrusts him to find her five-year-old son and unite him with his father. The father is revealed to be Abdul Zuban Tariq, head of the terrorist group.
    
Finding the boy in Kerala, the doctor and child set out on a journey to find his father. The journey follows the contemporary and mysterious path of the terrorist network in the vast country through various Indian states and with many unexpected incidents.
  
Veettilekkulla Vazhi is an adventure drama highlighting human relationships. It emphasizes the path of love, survival, innocence and humanity, exploring a bloodstained facet of contemporary terrorism in India. The film is a travelogue through the most beautiful landscapes of India.

Cast
 Prithviraj as Doctor  
Master Govardhan as Kid  
Malvika Sharma as Wife of doctor  
Indrajith as Rassaq, a Tamil Terrorist
Irshad as Abdulla  
Vinay Forrt as Terrorist Leader in Ajmeer  
S.Saji as Malayali Terrorist  
Melwyn as Sardarji Truck Driver  
Kiran Raj as Najeem  
 Assim Jamal as Terrorist Leader at Kashmir 
Lakshmipriya as Rashida as Kid's mother  
 Dhanya Mary Varghese as Teacher

Production
Veettilekkulla Vazhi is the third directorial venture of Dr. Biju whose previous films are Saira and Raman. Veettilekkulla Vazhi is an adventure drama that wants to explore the bloodstained facets of present-day terrorism. Produced by B. C. Joshi under the banner of Soorya Cinema, the film was mainly shot from Ladakh, Kashmir, Jaisalmer, Jodhpur, Bikkneer, Ajmer, Pushkarand, Delhi and Kerala.

Festival screenings
The film was screened at 28 international film festivals including: 
 12th Mumbai Film Festival (Mumbai, India; 2010) as the opening film in the Indian Frames section.
 34th Cairo International Film Festival (Egypt; 2010) in the Out of Competition section.
 15th International Film Festival of Kerala (Trivandrum, India; 2010)
 3rd Jaipur International Film Festival (Jaipur, India; 2011)
 5th Chennai International Film Festival (Chennai, India; 2011)
 10th Imagine India International Film Festival (Madrid, Spain; 2011) in competition section.
 11th New York Indian Film Festival (New York, USA; 2011) in competition section
 Zanzibar International Film Festival (Zanzibar, Tanzania; 2011)
 London Indian Film Festival (London, UK; 2011)
 Bollywood and Beyond Film Festival (Germany; 2011)
 38th Telluride Film Festival (Telluride, USA; 2011)
 New Generation Film Festival (Frankfurt, Germany; 2011)
 Third Eye Asian Film Festival (Mumbai, India; 2011)
 Seattle Film Festival (Seattle, USA; 2011)

Accolades

References

External links
 
 
 Film Review by Daniel Nelson in OneWorld
 Film Review by Gautaman Bhaskaran in The Hindustan Times
 Film Review by Sanjith Sidhardhan in The Times of India
 

2010s Malayalam-language films
Films about terrorism in India
Films directed by Dr. Biju
Films shot in Ladakh
Films shot in Kerala
Best Malayalam Feature Film National Film Award winners
Indian drama films
2010 drama films
2010 films
Films about jihadism